The Wrong Side of Heaven and the Righteous Side of Hell, Volume 2 is the fifth studio album by American heavy metal band Five Finger Death Punch, and the second of two albums released by the band in 2013, with Volume 1 having been released on July 30. It was released on November 19, 2013 through Prospect Park. The album was entirely produced by Kevin Churko and Five Finger Death Punch.

Background
On February 15, 2013, Five Finger Death Punch announced that they were working on their fourth album. On March 18, the band posted a promotional video for an upcoming tour with a new song titled "Here to Die".

On May 1, 2013, the band announced that they would be releasing two studio albums in the year, with The Wrong Side of Heaven and the Righteous Side of Hell, Volume 1 being released on July 30, and Volume 2 following on November 19. Guitarist Zoltan Bathory said of the band's decision to release two albums: "We came off the road after a couple of great years of touring and were really amped up to write the 4th record. Everybody was in the right headspace and the band tighter than ever so it was a perfect storm. We jumped in head first and found ourselves 12–13 songs deep fairly quick but were still coming up with better and better material so we looked at each other and said... okay why stop there?... let’s keep going. Once we passed the 24th song we knew we’re going to have to do a double album. We had this massive amount of music that’s very dear to us, possibly the best material this band has ever created. At that point there was no way to decide which songs to leave off the album. So we made the decision to release them all."

Singles 
The album's first single, "Battle Born", was released on September 10, 2013. The song's given title is a reference to the Flag of Nevada, the home state of the band.

The second single, a folk traditional cover of "House of the Rising Sun", was released on February 3, 2014.

Commercial performance
Preorders for the album went up on iTunes on August 10, 2013. On its release, the album debuted at No. 2 on the Billboard 200 and No. 1 on Top Rock Albums, selling 77,000 copies in its first week. The album has sold 510,000 copies in the US as of July 2015.

Track listing

Charts

Year-end charts

Certifications

Personnel
 Ivan Moody – vocals (1–6) and (8–12)
 Zoltan Bathory – rhythm guitar (1–6) and (8–12)
 Jason Hook – lead guitar, backing vocals 
 Jeremy Spencer – drums, percussion (1–6) and (8–12)
 Chris Kael – bass, backing vocals (1–6) and (8–12)
 Ryan Clark – guest vocals on "Weight Beneath My Sin"
 Rob Zombie – guest vocals on "Burn MF"
 Kevin Churko – production

References 

2013 albums
Five Finger Death Punch albums
Albums produced by Kevin Churko